A khaṭvāṅga is a long, studded club originally created as a weapon. It was adopted as a traditional religious symbol in Indian religions such as Tantric traditions like Shaivism and Vajrayana Buddhism. The khatvāṅga was adopted by some lineages of historical tantra though it preceded such traditions as of an original tribal shaman shaft.

Hinduism
In Hinduism, Shiva-Rudra carried the khatvāṅga as a staff weapon and are thus referred to as khatvāṅgīs. Author Robert Beer says, "In Hinduism the khatvanga is an emblem or weapon of Shiva, and is variously described as a skull - topped club, a skull - mounted trident, or a trident - staff on which three skulls are impaled". 

Author A. V. Narasimha Murthy says, "In classical literature the weapon Khatvanga is mentioned in works like Mālatīmādhava of Bhavabhuti and Śiva Stutī of Narayana Panditacharya".

Fabrication
Originally, the khatvāṅga was made of bones, especially, the long bones of forearm or the leg of human beings or animals. Later, wood and metal were used.  The khatvāṅga is a long club with skulls engraved on the body. A khatvāṅga represents the vajra.

Vajrayana Buddhism
[[File:MET DP318675.jpg|thumb|270px|right|In Vajrayana Buddhism, the symbol of the skull-topped trident (khaṭvāṅga) is said to be inspired by its association with the Kāpālikas.<ref>{{cite book|author=Beer, Robert|date=2003|title=The handbook of Tibetan Buddhist symbols|publisher=Serindia Publications|isbn=1-932476-03-2|url=https://books.google.com/books?id=-3804Ud9-4IC&q=shaivite+charnel+ground&pg=PA102|page=102|access-date=February 3, 2010}}</ref> Pictured here is an ivory khaṭvāṅga, 15th century Chinese art, Metropolitan Museum of Art.]]

Author Robert Beer states that "The form of the Buddhist khaṭvāṅga derived from the emblematic staff of the early Indian Shaivite yogis, known as kapalikas or "skull-bearers". The kapalikas were originally miscreants who had been sentenced to a twelve-year term of penance for the crime of inadvertently killing a Brahmin. The penitent was prescribed to dwell in a forest hut, at a desolate crossroads, in a charnel ground, or under a tree; to live by begging; to practice austerities; and to wear a loin-cloth of hemp, dog, or donkey-skin. They also had to carry the emblems of a human skull as an alms-bowl, and the skull of the Brahmin they had slain mounted upon a wooden staff as a banner. These Hindu kapalika ascetics soon evolved into an extreme outcaste sect of the "left-hand" Tantric path (Sanskrit: Vāmamārga) of shakti or goddess worship. The early Buddhist tantric yogins and yoginis adopted the same goddess or dakini attributes of the kapalikas. These attributes consisted of; bone ornaments, an animal skin loincloth, marks of human ash, a skull-cup, damaru, flaying knife, thighbone trumpet, and the skull-topped Tantric staff or khaṭvāṅga''".

Robert Beer relates how the symbolism of the khatvāṅga in Vajrayana Buddhism, particularly the Nyingma school founded by Padmasambhava, was a direct borrowing from the Shaiva Kapalikas, who frequented places of austerity such as charnel grounds and crossroads as a form of "left-handed path" (vamachara) sādhanā. In the Buddhist lore, it is also a particular divine attribute of Padmasambhava and endemic to his iconographic representation and depicted as an accoutrement of his divine consorts, Mandarava and Yeshe Tsogyal. In the twilight language, it represents Yab-Yum. The weapon's three severed heads denotes moksha from the three worlds (Trailokya); it has a rainbow sash representing the Five Pure Lights of the mahābhūta.

References

Weapons in Hindu mythology
Buddhist ritual implements
Weapons in Buddhist mythology